The Central District of Quchan County is a district (bakhsh) in Quchan County, Razavi Khorasan province, Iran. At the 2006 census, its population was 169,575, in 42,844 families.  The district has one city: Quchan. The district has four rural districts (dehestan): Dughayi Rural District, Quchan Atiq Rural District, Shirin Darreh Rural District, and Sudlaneh Rural District.

References 

Districts of Razavi Khorasan Province
Quchan County